Sir John Hill was an English composer, actor, author and botanist. He contributed to contemporary periodicals and engaged in literary battles with poets, playwrights and scientists. He is remembered for his illustrated botanical compendium The Vegetable System, one of the first works to use the nomenclature of Carl Linnaeus. In recognition of his efforts, he was created a knight of the Order of Vasa in 1774 by Gustav III of Sweden and thereafter called himself Sir John Hill.

Biography 
He was the son of the Rev. Theophilus Hill and is said to have been born in Peterborough. He was apprenticed to an apothecary and on the completion of his apprenticeship he set up in a small shop in St Martin's Lane, Westminster. He also travelled over the country in search of rare herbs, with a view to publishing a hortus siccus, but the plan failed.

He obtained the degree of M.D. from the University of St. Andrews at a time when its fortunes were at a low ebb, and practised as a quack doctor, making considerable sums by the preparation of dubious herb and vegetable medicines. He was known for his "pectoral balsam of honey" and "tincture of bardana".

Work 
His first publication was a translation of Theophrastus's History of Stones (1746). From this time forward he was an indefatigable writer. He edited The British Magazine (1746–1750), and for two years (1751–1753) he wrote a daily letter, "The Inspector," for the London Advertiser and Literary Gazette. He also produced novels, plays and scientific works; and was a major contributor to the supplement of Ephraim Chambers's Cyclopaedia.

From 1759 to 1775 he was engaged on a huge botanical work, The Vegetable System (26 folio volumes), illustrated by 1,600 copper-plate engravings and published (plain) at thirty-eight guineas, and (coloured) at one hundred and sixty guineas. Hill's botanical labours were undertaken at the request of his patron, Lord Bute, and he was rewarded by the Order of Vasa from the King of Sweden in 1774.

Of the seventy-six separate works with which he is credited in the Dictionary of National Biography, the most valuable are those that deal with botany. He is reputed to have been the author of the second part of The Oeconomy of Human Life (1751), the first part of which is by Lord Chesterfield, and Hannah Glasse's famous manual of cookery was generally ascribed to him (see Boswell, ed. Hill, iii. 285). Samuel Johnson said of him that he was "an ingenious man, but had no veracity." See a Short Account of the Life, Writings and Character of the late Sir John Hill (1779), which is chiefly occupied with a descriptive catalogue of his works; also Temple Bar (1872, xxxv. 261–266).

John Hill's often provocative and scurrilous writings involved him in many quarrels, both in the field of science and that of literature.

Quarrel with the Royal Society, 1750–1751 
During the 1740s, and especially in 1746–1747, Hill attended many meetings of the Royal Society, and there presented the results of several of his studies, both in the field of botany (on the propagation of moss), medicine (a surgical operation to remove a needle from the abdominal wall of a man), and geology-chemistry (on the origin of the sapphire's colour, on chrysocolla, on an alternative to Windsor loam for the making of fire-resistant bricks). His works On the manner of seeding mosses and On Windsor loam appeared in the Royal Society's journal, the Philosophical Transactions.

On the basis of these contributions, Hill apparently hoped to be elected Fellow of the Royal Society. Furthermore, he had the backing of several members of the Royal Society: the botanist Peter Collinson, the physician and scientist William Watson, and the antiquarian William Stukeley. Moreover, Hill had links with important nobles: John Montagu, 2nd Duke of Montagu and Charles Lennox, 2nd Duke of Richmond, also Fellows of the Royal Society; and Sir Thomas Robinson, Governor of Barbados and antiquarian. Despite Hill's merits as a scientist (at a time when many Fellows had no scientific background) and his relations, his election to the title of Fellow failed to materialise.

Disappointed by the Royal Society's lack, in his opinion, of scientific standards, Hill started to criticise the Society. In December 1749, he started writing anonymous, critical reviews of some articles published in the Philosophical Transactions. Moreover, in January 1750, Hill began a campaign of criticism and derision against the Royal Society and its president, Martin Folkes, by publishing, under an alias, a treatise entitled Lucina sine concubitu. A letter humbly address'd to the Royal Society; In which is proved, by most Incontestable Evidence, drawn from Reason and Practice, that a Woman may conceive and be brought to bed, without any commerce with Man. Under the false name of Abraham Johnson, a physician and man-midwife, Hill claimed to have observed cases where women had become pregnant without having had any kind of sexual relations with a man.

The "paper war" of 1752–1753 

Henry Fielding attacked him in The Covent Garden Journal, Christopher Smart wrote a mock-epic, The Hilliad, against him, and David Garrick replied to his strictures against him by two epigrams, one of which runs: "For physics and farces, his equal there scarce is; His farces are physic, his physic a farce is."

He had other literary passages-at-arms with John Rich, who accused him of plagiarising his Orpheus, also with Samuel Foote and Henry Woodward.

Selected publications 

 Hill, John (1750), Lucine sine concubitu: a letter addressed to the Royal Society.
 Hill, John (1750), A Dissertation on Royal Societies.
 Hill, John (1751), Review of the Works of the Royal Society of London.
 Hill, John [attributed] (1751), The Oeconomy of Human Life 2.
 Hill, John (1751), A History of the Materia Medica
 Hill, John (1751–1753), "The Inspector" [daily column], London Advertiser and Literary Gazette: Much of Hill's part in the Paper War of 1752–1753 was carried out in this column.
 Hill, John (1752), The Impertinent
 Hill, John (1752), Letters from the Inspector to a Lady with the genuine Answers.
 Hill, John in: Cyclopaedia, or an Universal Dictionary of Arts and Sciences, Supplement. 1753 various articles
 Hill, John (1754), Urania: Or, a Complete View of the Heavens; Containing the Ancient and Modern Astronomy, in Form of a Dictionary: Illustrated with a Great Number of Figures ... A Work Intended for General Use, Intelligible to All Capacities, and Calculated for Entertainment as Well as Instruction. 
 Hill, John (1755), The useful family herbal. Reprinted as Hill, John (1810), The Family Herbal.
 Hill, John (1755), Thoughts concerning God and Nature.
 Hill, John (1756–1757), The British Herbal.
 Hill, John (1757),  Thomas Hale: Eden, or, A compleat body of gardening (editor)
 Hill, John (1758), Outlines of a System of vegetable generation.
 Hill, John (1759), The Virtues of Honey in Preventing Many of the Worst Disorders.
 Hill, John (1759–1775), The Vegetable System (26 volumes of text in folio).
Vol. I (1759) (Octavo edition)
Vol. II Part I (1761)
Vol. II, Part II (1761)
Vol. III (1761)
Vol. IV (1762)
Vol. V (1763)
 Hill, John (1770), The Construction of Timber from its Early Growth.
 Hill, John (1770–2), Virtues of British Herbs.
No. 1 (1770)
4th ed., with additions (1771)
1772 edition
 Hill, John (1773), A decade of curious insects.
 Hill, John (1776), Hypochondriasis A Practical Treatise

About John Hill 
 
 George Rousseau (1981). The Letters and Private Papers of Sir John Hill (New York:  AMS Press, 1981).
 George Rousseau 2012. The Notorious Sir John Hill: The Man Destroyed by Ambition in the Era of Celebrity (Lehigh University Press, Bethlehem, Pennsylvania: 2012). Pp. xxxi, 389; illustrated. 
Elliott, Brent (2011). "Hill's Vegetable Kingdom" in Eighteenth-century Science in the Garden - Occasional Papers from RHS Lindley Library, volume 5 March 2011.

References 

Attribution

Bibliography

External links 
 
 
 
 

1714 births
1775 deaths
18th-century English novelists
18th-century British botanists
Botanical illustrators
English dramatists and playwrights
English male dramatists and playwrights
English male journalists
English male novelists
English non-fiction writers
English science writers
Herbalists
People from Peterborough
Pre-Linnaean botanists
Recipients of the Order of Vasa
18th-century English male writers